Ngandu, N’gandu or Ng'andu is an African name that may refer to
Ngandu Kasongo (born 1979), Congolese football player 
N’gandu Peter Magande, Zambian economist
Canaan Ngandu (born c.1972), Zimbabwean sculptor
Pius Ngandu Nkashama, writer, playwright, poet and literary critic from Democratic Republic of the Congo